Carex praeceptorum (orth.var. C. praeceptorium) is a species of sedge known by the common names early sedge and teacher's sedge.

Distribution
It is native to much of western North America, from British Columbia to California to Colorado, where it grows in wet, marshy habitat such as bogs and lakeshores.

Description
This sedge produces small clumps of short, grasslike stems 10 to 30 centimeters tall from a thin network of rhizomes. The thin, grayish to pale green leaves are up to about 15 centimeters in length but shorter than the stems. The inflorescence is a small, dense bundle of a few brown flower spikes. The fruit is coated in a dark colored perigynium.

External links
Calflora Database: Carex praeceptorum (Early sedge,  Teacher's sedge)
Jepson eFlora treatment of Carex praeceptorum
USDA Plants Profile for Carex praeceptorum
Flora of North America
UC CalPhotos gallery of Carex praeceptorum images

praeceptorum
Flora of California
Flora of British Columbia
Flora of the Northwestern United States
Flora of the Sierra Nevada (United States)
Plants described in 1931
Taxa named by Kenneth Kent Mackenzie
Flora without expected TNC conservation status